Gunfighter's Moon is a 1995 American Western film produced by Douglas Curtis, directed by Larry Ferguson and starring Lance Henriksen, Kay Lenz and David McIlwraith. Also appearing are Nikki DeLoach, Ivan Sergei and James Victor.

Tagline
"Calling Frank Morgan a Gunfighter is Like Calling The Desert Dry!"

Plot
A veteran gunfighter is summoned to Red Pine in Wyoming by a former lover. She wants to protect her new husband, (a store-keeper who is the temporary town sheriff), from a gang of outlaws who want to free one of their number who is being held for killing the lawman's predecessor during a bank robbery. What the gunfighter is unaware of, is that he is the father of a teenage girl. She also doesn't know.

Cast
 Lance Henriksen as Frank Morgan
 Kay Lenz as Linda Yarnell
 David McIlwraith as Jordan Yarnell
 Nikki DeLoach as Kristen Yarnell
 Ivan Sergei as Spud Walker
 James Victor as Juan Acosta

Production
The film had different titles in various countries; for instance: Das letzte Duell in Germany.

Filming location
British Columbia, Canada

References

External links

Rotten Tomatoes

1995 films
1995 Western (genre) films
American Western (genre) films
1990s English-language films
Films set in Wyoming
Films scored by Lee Holdridge
Films directed by Larry Ferguson
1990s American films